Alexander Allan or Allen may refer to:

Politics and law
 Sir Alexander Allan, 1st Baronet (c. 1764–1820), British politician, Member of Parliament for Berwick-upon-Tweed
 Alexander Allen (politician) (1842–1924), American politician in the state of Washington
 Alex Allan (born 1951), British civil servant

Sports
 Scotty Allan or Allan Alexander Allan (1867–1941), Scottish-born American dog musher
 Alex Allan (footballer) (fl. 1910s), Scottish footballer
 Alex Allen (baseball) (fl. 1940s), Negro league baseball player 
 Alexander Allen (bridge) (born 1953), American bridge player
 Sandy Allen (cricketer) (born 1984), English cricketer
 Alex Allan (rugby union) (born 1992), Scotland rugby union player

Others
 Alexander Allan (ship owner) (1780–1854), Scottish sea captain and businessman
 Alexander Allan (locomotive engineer) (1809–1891), Scottish mechanical engineer
 Alexander Allen (writer) (1814–1842), English writer and linguist
 Alexander Viets Griswold Allen (1841–1908), American theologian
 Florence Parry Heide (pen name "Alex B. Allen", 1919–2011), American children's author
 Alexander J. Allen (fl. 1930s), American physicist, namesake of Allen Hall (University of Pittsburgh)
 Alexander Allen (stylist) (active since 2001), American fashion stylist

See also
Allan (disambiguation)
Allen (surname)